Robin Haase was the defending champion, but he did not defend his title due to an injury.
Robin Söderling, who would have been the 2nd seed, entered late and played the qualifying tournament. He was not seeded in the main draw, but he defeated: Müller, Bolelli, Schüttler, López and he reached the final. He won 6–1, 6–1, against 1st seeded Tomáš Berdych in the last match of this tournament.

Seeds

Draw

Final four

Top half

Bottom half

External links
 Main Draw
 Qualifying Draw

2009 ATP Challenger Tour
2009,Singles